The 1990 NCAA Division I baseball tournament was played at the end of the 1990 NCAA Division I baseball season to determine the national champion of college baseball.  The tournament concluded with eight teams competing in the College World Series, a double-elimination tournament in its forty fourth year.  Eight regional competitions were held to determine the participants in the final event.  Each region was composed of six teams, resulting in 48 teams participating in the tournament at the conclusion of their regular season, and in some cases, after a conference tournament.  The forty-fourth tournament's champion was Georgia, coached by Steve Webber.  The Most Outstanding Player was Mike Rebhan of Georgia.

Regionals
The opening rounds of the tournament were played across eight regional sites across the country, each consisting of a six-team field. Each regional tournament is double-elimination. The winners of each regional advanced to the College World Series.

Bold indicates winner.

Northeast Regional
At Waterbury, CT

Atlantic Regional
At Coral Gables, FL

South I Regional
At Baton Rouge, LA

South II Regional
At Starkville, MS

Midwest Regional
At Wichita, KS

Central Regional
At Austin, TX

West I Regional
At Palo Alto, CA

West II Regional
At Tempe, AZ

College World Series

Participants

Results

Bracket

Game results

All-Tournament Team
The following players were members of the College World Series All-Tournament Team.

Notable players
 Cal State Fullerton: Frank Charles, Huck Flener, Phil Nevin, Steve Sisco
 The Citadel: Anthony Jenkins, Chris Lemonis,  Dan McDonnell, Tony Skole
 Georgia: Dave Fleming
 Georgia Southern: Todd Greene, Joey Hamilton, Chris Petersen
 LSU: Paul Byrd, Rick Greene, Lyle Mouton, John O'Donoghue, Chad Ogea, Keith Osik, Mike Sirotka
 Mississippi State: Jon Shave
 Oklahoma State: Jeromy Burnitz, Dave Mlicki, Danny Perez, Brad Dolejsi
 Stanford: Paul Carey, Jeffrey Hammonds, David McCarty, Mike Mussina, Brian Sackinsky, Stan Spencer

See also
 1990 NCAA Division I softball tournament
 1990 NCAA Division II baseball tournament
 1990 NCAA Division III baseball tournament
 1990 NAIA World Series

References

 

NCAA Division I Baseball Championship
Tournament
Baseball in Austin, Texas